Jewel spider is the common name of several different species of orb weaver spiders:

Araneus gemmoides, the North American jewel spider
Austracantha minax, the Australian jewel spider
Gasteracantha cancriformis, sometimes known as the jewel box spider or jewel spider
Gasteracantha fornicata, the northern jewelled spider of Australia

Set index articles on spiders